Manju Kumari Yadav may refer to:

 Manju Kumari Yadav (Sonama Rural Municipality), Nepalese politician from Sonama Rural Municipality
 Manju Kumari Yadav (Bhangaha), Nepalese politician from Bhangaha